"It Hasn't Happened Yet" is a song written by John Hiatt, and originally recorded and released by Hiatt on his 1980 album Two Bit Monsters.  American country music artist Rosanne Cash subsequently covered the song, releasing it in March 1983 as the third single from her album Somewhere in the Stars.  Cash's version of "It Hasn't Happened Yet" reached #14 on the Billboard Hot Country Singles & Tracks chart.

Other versions
Ricky Nelson also covered the song on his 1981 album, Playing to Win.

Chart performance

References

1983 singles
1981 songs
John Hiatt songs
Ricky Nelson songs
Rosanne Cash songs
Songs written by John Hiatt
Columbia Records singles
Song recordings produced by Rodney Crowell